Gubernatorial elections in the Democratic Republic of the Congo were scheduled to be held in 2009, either before or after the creation of fifteen new provinces in February that year. There were delays in creating the new provinces, and the elections were cancelled.

Congo, Democratic Republic of the gubernatorial elections, 2009
Gubernatorial elections
2009